The Mula Photovoltaic Power Plant is a 494 megawatt (MW) photovoltaic power station in Mula, Region of Murcia, Spain. Built by Cobra (ACS Group), it opened in July 2019.

At the time of its opening, it was the largest photovoltaic power station in Europe, replacing Cestas Solar Park in France.

See also 

Solar power in Spain
Photovoltaic power stations
List of largest power stations in the world
List of photovoltaic power stations

References 

Photovoltaic power stations in Spain
Energy in the Region of Murcia
hla extratereste